Ain Sokhna is an Egyptian city in the Suez Governorate.

Sokhna may also refer to:
Porto El Sokhna SC, Egyptian sports club

People with the given name
Sokhna Benga (born 1967), Senegalese novelist and poet
Sokhna Galle (born 1994), French athlete
Sokhna Magat Diop (1917–2003), Senegalese religious leader
Sokhna Mame Diarra Bousso (1833–1866), Murid Saint
Sokhna Sy (born 1988), Senegalese basketball player

See also
 Sokna, Norway

Feminine given names